The Canada women's national wheelchair basketball team is one of Canada's most successful national sporting teams. It is the only national women's wheelchair basketball team to have won three consecutive gold medals at the Paralympic Games in 1992, 1996 and 2000, and the only one to have won four consecutive World Wheelchair Basketball Championships, in 1994, 1998, 2002 and 2006. In 2014 it won a fifth World Championship.

History 
Wheelchair basketball has been played in Canada since the 1940s. A women's tournament was held at the 1968 Summer Paralympics in Tel Aviv, and a Canadian women's team participated in the 1972 Summer Paralympics.

The women's team went on to become one of Canada's most successful national sporting teams, rivalled only by the ice hockey teams. It is the only national women's wheelchair basketball team to have won three consecutive gold medals at the Paralympic Games and the only one to have won four consecutive World Wheelchair Basketball Championships,. In 2014 it won a fifth world championship at the 2014 Women's World Wheelchair Basketball Championship in Toronto.

Paralympic games 
Team Canada is the only team to have won three consecutive gold medals at the Summer Paralympics, in 1992, 1996 and 2000.
 1972 : 5th
 1976 : 4th
 1984 : 4th
 1988 : 4th
 1992 :  Gold
 1996 :  Gold
 2000 :  Gold
 2004 :  Bronze
 2008 : 5th
 2012 : 6th
 2016 : 5th

IWBF World Championships 
The first Wheelchair Basketball World Championship for women was held in 1990, and since then Team Canada has won five times, including four consecutive wins in 1994, 1998, 2002 and 2006.
In 2014 it won a fifth World Championship before a home crowd in Toronto.
 1990 :  Bronze
 1994 :  Gold
 1998 :  Gold
 2002 :  Gold
 2006 :  Gold
 2010 :  Bronze
 2014 :  Gold
 2018 : 5th

Other International Tournaments

Parapan American Games  
Team Canada has won four silver medals at the Parapan Am Games:
 1986 :  Silver
 2007 :  Silver
 2011 :  Silver
 2015 :  Silver

Women's U25 World Wheelchair Basketball Championships 
The inaugural Women's U25 World Wheelchair Basketball Championships was held from 15 to 21 July 2011 at Brock University in St. Catharines, Ontario. The Canadian team was placed fourth, after the United States, Australia and Great Britain. The team included Cindy Ouellet, Maude Jacques, Jamey Jewells, Tamara Steeves and Abby Stubbert. At the 2015 Women's U25 Wheelchair Basketball World Championship in Beijing, Canada placed fourth after Great Britain, Australia and China.

Teams

2012 Summer Paralympic Games 

Team Canada at the 2012 Summer Paralympic Games in London consisted of:

2014 Women's World Wheelchair Basketball Championship 
The gold-medal winning 2014 Women's World Wheelchair Basketball Championship team consisted of:

 Coach : Bill Johnson
 Assistant coaches :  Michael Broughton, Michele Hynes
 Physiotherapist : Sheila Forler Bauman
 Team Doctor : Richard Goudie
 Massage Therapist : Sophie Lavardière
 Team Manager : Katie Miyazaki
 Sports psychologist : Adrienne Leslie-Toogood
 Physiologist : Mike Dahl
 Strength coach : Kyle Turcotte

See also 
 Canada women's national basketball team

Notes

References

Further reading

External links 
 Wheelchair Basketball Canada

Canada at the Paralympics
Wheelchair Basketball, women's
Canada